Terran 1 is an expendable two-stage small-lift launch vehicle developed by Relativity Space since 2017. Unique to Relativity, most structures and components in the vehicle are manufactured with 3D printing processes.

The maximum payload was expected to be  to  low Earth orbit (LEO). Relativity's advertised launch price was $12 million USD per Terran 1 mission.

Design 
Terran 1 consists of two stages. The first stage is powered by nine Aeon 1 engines burning methane and oxygen propellants in a gas-generator cycle, each producing  of thrust. The second stage is powered by a single vacuum-optimized version of Aeon 1, known as AeonVac, producing  of thrust in vacuum. Both stages will be autogenously pressurized. 

The primary and secondary structures of Terran 1 are manufactured with Relativity's Stargate 3D printer out of a proprietary aluminum alloy. 90% of Terran 1 by mass consists of printed components; Relativity claims that they can reduce the part count in the vehicle by 100 times compared to traditionally-manufactured rockets and manufacture an entire flight article from raw materials in 60 days. Relativity's in-development Terran R launch vehicle will utilize the same tooling used to manufacture Terran 1.

Relativity advertised a price per launch for Terran 1 of US$10 million in 2019. The advertised price per launch had been increased to $12 million USD in 2021.

Planned upgrades 
In February 2022, Relativity CEO Tim Ellis stated in an interview with Ars Technica that the current configuration of Terran 1, with nine Aeon 1 engines on the first stage, will be replaced after the third flight with a stage featuring a single Aeon R engine with substantially higher thrust. The Aeon R engine is planned to be used on Relativity's much larger Terran R rocket.

Launches 
Relativity received a Federal Aviation Administration (FAA) launch license to conduct the first launch of Terran 1, not-earlier-than (NET) 8 March 2023 from Cape Canaveral Space Force Station's Launch Complex 16. Originally, another static fire was planned with the full rocket stack before first launch. However, Relativity decided it performed enough tests and instead decided to go for a launch attempt.
Terran 1's initial flight scheduled for 8 March 2023 was a scrub due to "exceeding launch commit criteria limits for propellant thermal conditions on stage two". A second launch attempt on 11 March was also a scrub. Set for 1800 GMT, high upper level winds prevented launch for over an hour. A second attempt at 1935 GMT was stopped at T-70 seconds by a boat in the launch safety range.

A third attempt 7 minutes later at 1942 GMT was cancelled half a second before liftoff. The engines briefly lit before shutting down from a "launch commit criteria violation." A final resort occurred at 2100 GMT, however an issue with the automatic stage separation promptly closed the launch window.

References 

Space launch vehicles of the United States